The Shell Cup could be:

 Shell Cup, renamed the Caribbean Cup
 Shell Cup, New Zealand limited overs cricket competition now known as the Ford Trophy
 Shell Cup – Defensive, renamed the Telus Cup – Defensive, an ice-hockey trophy in Quebec
 Shell Cup – Offensive, renamed the Telus Cup – Offensive, an ice-hockey trophy in Quebec